Proscelotes arnoldi, also known commonly as Arnold's skink or Arnold's montane skink, is a species of lizard in the family Scincidae. The species is endemic to Africa. Sometimes called a legless skink, it has tiny reduced limbs. The front limbs are very small, and both fore-limbs and hind-limbs have reduced function and appear to be vestigial attachments for its lifestyle and habitat.

Etymology
The specific name, arnoldi, is in honor of entomologist George Arnold (1881-1962) of the National Museum in Bulawayo, Zimbabwe.

Description
Its body is brown, but each scale has a dark metallic central spot so it has a shiny appearance. The belly is pale pink in juveniles to salmon-orange in adults.

Geographic range and behaviour
Arnold's skink is found in the Eastern Highlands of Zimbabwe in grasslands and forest and particularly the margins between habitats (like stream banks). This small skink lives in tussock or hamper type mountain grass and moss-beds hiding under stones and logs. It is not easily seen, but it's relatively easy to catch.

Reproduction
P. arnoldii may lay eggs or give birth to live young. Some females have been found containing 4-5 eggs, while others have been found containing 5-6 embryos.

References

Further reading
Hewitt J (1932). "Some New Species and Subspecies of South African Batrachians and Lizards". Annals of the Natal Museum 7 (1): 105–128. (Sepsina arnoldi, new species, pp. 112–114, text figure).

Skinks of Africa
Reptiles described in 1932
Proscelotes
Taxa named by John Hewitt (herpetologist)
Fauna of the Eastern Highlands